Saar referendum may refer to

 the 1935 Saar status referendum (or plebiscite),
or to
 the 1955 Saar Statute referendum

 For the procedures for initiating other referenda in the German state of Saarland, please see:
Referendums in Germany#Initiative quorum